The SMK was an armored vehicle prototype developed by the Soviet Union prior to the Second World War. It was named after Sergei Mironovich Kirov, a Communist Party official assassinated in 1934. The SMK was discovered and classified by German intelligence as the T-35C, leading to the misunderstanding that the T-35 took part in the Winter War.

Only one was built and after a trial showing the downsides of its weight and size against the KV tank and brief use in the war with Finland, the project was dropped.

Design and development
The SMK was among the designs competing to replace the unreliable and expensive T-35 multi-turreted heavy tank. A design team under Josef Kotin at the Kirovski Works (formerly the Putilov Works) at Leningrad designed the tank. Competition came from the former OKMO designer N. Barykov at the Bolshevik Plant with their T-100 tank.

Meetings in 1938 reduced the number of turrets in the specification and a move to torsion bar from spring suspension. Kotin and his assistant independently designed a single-turret version of the SMK which received Stalin's approval and the name KV. Production of two prototypes was ordered.

The SMK's armament was a short 76.2 mm gun in the upper centrally placed turret and a 45 mm weapon in the forward turret.

Service history
The SMK, the two KV-1 prototypes and the two T-100 prototypes were put through proving trials before being tested operationally in combat at the Battle of Summa during the Winter War against Finland. The vehicles formed a company of the 91st Tank Battalion of the 20th Heavy Tank Brigade. The unit was under the command of the son of the Defence Commissar. After being immobilized by a mine, the SMK had to be abandoned and was not recovered for 2 months.

The KV design proved superior in both trials in Finland and was accepted.

Armor

See also 
 List of tanks of the Soviet Union

References 
Notes

Bibliography
Zaloga & Gransden Soviet Havy Tanks Osprey Publishing
  on battlefield.ru.
WWII Vehicles - Soviet Union's SMK

External links
 SMK at Battlefield.ru

Heavy tanks of the Soviet Union
Multi-turreted tanks
World War II tanks of the Soviet Union
Abandoned military projects of the Soviet Union
Trial and research tanks of the Soviet Union
Military vehicles introduced in the 1930s